Lieutenant General Sir Walter Campbell,  (30 July 1864 – 11 August 1936) was a British Army officer who served as Quartermaster-General to the Forces.

Early life and education
Campbell was born in County Antrim, Ireland, the son of John Campbell of Rathfern, White Abbey, Belfast. He was educated at Wellington College and Trinity College, Cambridge, but left university after three years for Sandhurst when he decided upon a military career.

Military career
Campbell was commissioned a second lieutenant in the Gordon Highlanders on 5 February 1887, promoted to lieutenant on 5 December 1890, and saw early service with the Waziristan Field Force and the Chitral Relief Force (1895). He was promoted to captain on 11 January 1897, served in the Tirah Expeditionary Force (1897–98), and received a brevet promotion to major on 20 May 1898. In 1899–1900 he served in the Second Boer War, for which he was appointed a Companion of the Distinguished Service Order (DSO) in November 1900. He then became Brigade Major for the Highland Brigade serving in South Africa. The war ended with the Peace of Vereeniging in late May 1902, and the following month Campbell returned home in the SS Tagus, arriving at Southampton in July. Following his return, he was on 19 October 1902 appointed Deputy Assistant Adjutant-General (DAAG) to the 3rd Army Corps, stationed in Ireland.

He served in the First World War becoming Deputy Quartermaster-General to the Mediterranean Expeditionary Force taking part in the evacuation at Gallipoli. By June 1918 he was Quartermaster-General with the Imperial Camel Corps in Jordan. According to The Times, Campbell's "genius for administration made him an outstanding figure of the War."

In 1918, he was sketched by artist James McBey, the official war artist to the Palestine Expeditionary Force.

He was appointed Quartermaster-General to the Forces in 1923; he retired four years later and died on 11 August 1936.

References

 

|-

1864 births
1936 deaths
British Army lieutenant generals
Military personnel from County Antrim
British Army generals of World War I
Knights Commander of the Order of the Bath
Knights Commander of the Order of St Michael and St George
Companions of the Distinguished Service Order
Gordon Highlanders officers
Walter
British military personnel of the Chitral Expedition
British military personnel of the Tirah campaign
British Army personnel of the Second Boer War